Phylohydrax is a genus of plants in the Rubiaceae. It contains two species:

 Phylohydrax carnosa (Hochst.) Puff - Madagascar, South Africa
 Phylohydrax madagascariensis (Willd. ex Roem. & Schult.) Puff - Tanzania, Madagascar

References

External links
photo of herbarium specimen at Missouri Botanical Garden, collected near Durban, South Africa, Lewis, Walter Hepworth - 6291, Phylohydrax carnosa 
photo of herbaruim specimen at Missouri Botanical Garden, collected in Madagascar, Miller, James Spencer - 3840, Phylohydrax madagascariensis 

Rubiaceae genera
Spermacoceae